Katerina Stefanidi (Greek: Κατερίνα Στεφανίδη; born 4 February 1990) is a Greek pole vaulter. She won the gold medal at the 2016 Rio Olympics with a jump of 4.85 meters and has also competed at the 2012 London and the 2020 Tokyo Olympics. Stefanidi was the 2017 World champion and earned bronze at the 2019 World Championships. Indoors, she is a two-time World Indoor bronze medallist from 2016 and 2018. At the European Athletics Championships, she won two gold medals (2016, 2018) and two silvers (2014, 2022). She also earned two medals at the European Indoor Championships and is a four-time Diamond League winner.

Stefanidi has won a total of 11 medals in all five major international athletics championships. She was named the European Women's Athlete of the Year in 2017, and the Greek Female Athlete of the Year in 2017 and 2019. Because of her achievements she is widely regarded as the greatest female athlete in the history of Greek sport.

Personal life
Katerina Stefanidi was born to athletes Georgios Stefanidis and Zoi Vareli, who competed internationally in the triple jump and sprints, respectively. Her younger sister, Georgia, is also a pole vaulter. In 2015, she married Mitchell Krier, her future coach and also a former pole vaulter. She lives in the United States.

Career

Junior level: 2005–2010
Stefanidi attended the 1st High School of Pallini and won the National High School Championships. She broke the National High School record and the Championship record winning gold at the 2006 Gymnasiade. Growing up she broke all of the World age-group records for the ages of 11–14 and right after she turned 15, she broke the World Youth (under-18) record with a jump of 4.37 m. Her first international experience came at the age of 15, when she represented Greece at the 2005 World Youth Championships in Marrakesh, placing first with 4.30 m. At the 2007 World Youths, held in Ostrava, she was second with 4.25 m. In 2008, she won the bronze medal with 4.25 m at the World Junior Championships in Bydgoszcz, Poland. The same year she gained an athletic scholarship at Stanford University and began competing for the Stanford Cardinal. She received her master's degree in cognitive psychology with Dr. Gene A. Brewer at Arizona State University while training under the guidance of 2000 Olympic Champion Nick Hysong.

At Stanford, Stefanidi broke the freshman school record with a jump of 4.13 m, under the guidance of coach Kris Mack and head coach Edrick Floreal. In 2010, under the guidance of Toby Stevenson, she tied for fifth place (4.30 m) at the NCAA Indoor Championships, was the Pac-10 Conference Champion and tied for fourth (4.25 m) at the NCAA Outdoor Championships, after breaking the school record multiple times.

2011–2013
In 2011, she was second at the NCAA Indoor Championships with 4.40 m. That same year she defended her Pac-10 Conference title (4.28 m) and was third at the NCAA Outdoor Championships (4.40 m). She placed second at the European Athletics U23 Championships in Ostrava and third at Universiade in Shenzhen, China, after jumping a personal best of 4.45 m to tie the Greek under-23 record. Her senior year, Stefanidi placed third at the NCAA Indoor Championships (4.35 m).

In the 2012 outdoor season, she was the Pac-12 Conference Champion, in Eugene, Oregon, where she broke her own school record with 4.48 m. A month later she became the NCAA Champion in Des Moines, Iowa (4.45 m). Her season best, 4.51 m, achieved in July 2012 at Livermore, California, is the Greek under-23 record.
In 2013, she faced some injury problems, thus not improving her personal best, with a 4.45 m season best.

2014–2015
In the 2014 indoor season, she improved her personal best at 4.55 m. In the 2014 outdoor season, she improved her personal best at 4.57 m and established a new personal best at 4.60 m at the Diamond League meeting at New York City, where she placed 4th. She competed for the first time at the European Athletics Team Championships 1st league, held in Tallinn, representing Greece and winning with a 4.55 m jump. She managed to improve her PB again at the Diamond league in Glasgow with a jump at 4.65 m, taking the third place. One week before the European Championships she set another PB at 4.71 m, equaling the outdoor Greek national record.

At the 2014 European Championships, she had an easy qualification, while in the final she had her first success in major events as a woman by winning the silver medal with 4.60 m, losing the gold medal in the very last jump of the event, made by Anzhelika Sidorova. She later won the Birmingham Diamond League meeting with 4.57 m and took the third place at the Diamond league final, held in Zurich with 4.67 m. With these results, she took the second place overall at the Diamond League series, only behind Fabiana Murer. During 2014, she jumped 10 times above 4.55 m, while her former PB was at 4.51 m.

During the 2015 indoor season, she set a personal best four times (4.56 m, 4.60 m, 4.61 m and 4.77 m, which was temporarily a national record). At the 2015 European Indoor Championships, she won the silver medal with 4.75 m. In April 2015, she was named Female Athlete of the Month by European Athletics.

2016–present
During training season and outside of competitions, she trained at SPIRE Institute and Academy, an olympic training center in Geneva, Ohio.

In the 2016 indoor season, she set a national record with a huge leap at 4.90 m at the Millrose Games, which ranks her at fourth place of all time in the event, tied with Demi Payne who cleared the same height at the same meeting. At the World Indoor Championships in Portland, she won the bronze medal with a jump of 4.80 m. In the following months she continuously improved her personal outdoor record (4.73, 4.75 and 4.77 m) and in Filothei she set an outdoor national record of 4.86 m. In July, at the 2016 European Championships in Athletics she won the gold medal with 4.81 m, taking the competition record from Yelena Isinbayeva.

At the 2016 Rio Olympics she became Olympic champion with a jump of 4.85 m, becoming the seventh Greek female athlete, and fourth in athletics, (after Voula Patoulidou, Athanasia Tsoumeleka, Fani Chalkia, Sofia Bekatorou, Emilia Tsoulfa and Anna Korakaki) to win a gold medal at the Summer Olympics. In September, she ranked first and won the diamond at the 2016 Diamond League series.

During the 2017 indoor season, she became the European champion at the European Indoor Championships with a jump of 4.85 m, setting a new  height. In the 2017 summer season she set a world lead in the Rome Golden Gala with 4,85 and attempted for the first time to set a new world record. Two years after a disappointing performance at the 2015 World Championship where she missed the final, Stefanidi won the gold medal at the 2017 World Championships in Athletics in London, where she even broke her own Greek record – and set a new world lead for 2017 – by vaulting 4.91 m. Katerina completed her 2017 outdoor season undefeated (14 wins in a row) and winning the Diamond league final in Brussels.

On Saturday 14 October 2017, at the traditional European Athletic Association gala in Vilnius, Lithuania, she was named European Women's Athlete of the Year.

In 2018, Stefanidi increased her collection of medals, taking the third place (4.80 m) at the World Indoor Championships in Birmingham, and the first place (4.85 m) at the European Championships in Berlin. She won the 2018 Diamond League series (4.87 m) for a third consecutive year and completed the season with a second place (4.85 m) behind Anzhelika Sidorova, representing Europe at the Continental Cup.

In 2019, she won the Diamond League series (4.83 m) for a record fourth consecutive year and won the bronze medal at the 2019 World Championships in Athletics in Doha.

In 2020, as the COVID-19 pandemic shut down most public sports events, Stefanidi, along with Katie Nageotte and Alysha Newman, took part in an online event conceived by Renaud Lavillenie and organized by World Athletics called "The Ultimate Garden Clash", during which the competitors had to collect as many vault clearances in two 15-minute periods in their respective isolated practice tracks; Stefanidi won with 34 clearances. She was training at SPIRE Institute and Academy to prepare for the 2020 Olympics. At the 2020 Olympics she took the 4th place, equaling her season's best, with a jump of 4.80 metres.

Honours & results

Record progression

Gallery

References

External links

1990 births
Living people
Greek female pole vaulters
Athletes from Athens
Stanford Cardinal women's track and field athletes
Athletes (track and field) at the 2012 Summer Olympics
Athletes (track and field) at the 2016 Summer Olympics
Olympic athletes of Greece
Track and field athletes from California
World Athletics Championships athletes for Greece
Greek European Athletics champions (track and field)
Olympic gold medalists for Greece
Olympic gold medalists in athletics (track and field)
Medalists at the 2016 Summer Olympics
Universiade medalists in athletics (track and field)
World Athletics Championships medalists
Olympic female pole vaulters
Greek emigrants to the United States
European Athlete of the Year winners
Universiade bronze medalists for Greece
Medalists at the 2011 Summer Universiade
World Athletics Championships winners
Diamond League winners
Athletes (track and field) at the 2020 Summer Olympics
20th-century Greek women
21st-century Greek women